The Milchbuck Tunnel is a motor road tunnel in Switzerland, and forms part of the A1L motorway from Zürich Schwamendingen to Zürich Letten, where the tunnel's southern portal lies on Wasserwerkstrasse, which leads into central Zürich.

A proposed second tunnel bore (to create two separate tunnels for two directions of traffic) was turned down. Now, only one lane handles traffic into downtown Zurich, one lane handle traffic leaving the city, with an emergency lane in the middle. By 2006, the emergency services in the tunnel has been upgraded, with the escape path being added. At the northern portal in the direction to the city, the entrance to Irchel underground car park is to the left of the lane.

At about the midpoint of the Milchbuck tunnel, the Weinberg rail tunnel passes beneath it.

References

External links 
 

Road tunnels in Switzerland
Buildings and structures in Zürich
Tunnels completed in 1978